Cameron Kenneth Ward (born February 29, 1984) is a Canadian former professional ice hockey goaltender. He played the majority of his 15-year professional career for the Carolina Hurricanes of the National Hockey League (NHL). He played for the Chicago Blackhawks during his final season before signing a one-day contract to officially retire as a Hurricane in 2019.

Ward was born in Saskatoon, growing up there and in Sherwood Park, Alberta. During his three-year junior career in the Western Hockey League (WHL) with the Red Deer Rebels, he was selected 25th overall by the Hurricanes in the 2002 NHL Entry Draft. After a season with the Hurricanes' American Hockey League (AHL) affiliate, the Lowell Lock Monsters, he won the Stanley Cup with the Hurricanes in 2006, winning the Conn Smythe Trophy as the most valuable player in the playoffs. He became the first starting goaltender to win the Stanley Cup as a rookie since Patrick Roy in 1986.

Playing career

Early career
Ward spent his junior career with the Red Deer Rebels of the Western Hockey League (WHL). After appearing in one game for the Rebels in 2000–01, Ward played three full seasons with the team from 2001–2004, leading them to the WHL finals twice. Ward was drafted 25th overall by the Carolina Hurricanes in the 2002 NHL Entry Draft. Upon graduating from the WHL, Ward signed a multi-year, entry-level contract with the Hurricanes on May 13, 2004. Due to the 2004–05 NHL lockout, he was assigned to Carolina's American Hockey League (AHL) affiliate, the Lowell Lock Monsters, for the season.

Carolina Hurricanes
Joining the Hurricanes for the 2005–06 NHL season, Ward largely served in a backup role to Swiss goalie Martin Gerber during the regular season. He made his NHL debut on October 5, 2005, replacing Gerber after the starter injured his hamstring. He saved 10 of 11 shots in the third period, as the Hurricanes lost 5–2 to the Tampa Bay Lightning. He made his first NHL start the following game two days later in the club's home opener against the Pittsburgh Penguins. Ward turned aside Mario Lemieux, Žigmund Pálffy and Sidney Crosby in a shootout, as the Hurricanes won 3–2. Ward completed his NHL rookie season with 14 wins and 8 losses, along with a 3.68 goals against average.

In the opening round of the 2006 Stanley Cup Playoffs, the Hurricanes faced a two-win deficit against the Montreal Canadiens. With Gerber struggling in the series, Hurricanes coach Peter Laviolette turned to Ward. The goaltending switch prompted Carolina to a series comeback, advancing to the second round against the New Jersey Devils, where he played opposite his personal hero, Martin Brodeur. After eliminating the Devils, the Hurricanes defeated the Buffalo Sabres in seven games. Facing the Edmonton Oilers in the 2006 Stanley Cup Finals, he helped the Hurricanes to the franchise's first Stanley Cup. In doing so, he became the first rookie goaltender to lead his team to the Stanley Cup as a starter since Patrick Roy in 1986. Against Edmonton, he also became the first rookie goaltender to both play and record a shutout in the Finals since Roy. He tied the rookie record for wins in the playoffs (15), previously held by Roy and Ron Hextall, and became the first rookie goalie to win the Conn Smythe Trophy since Hextall in 1987.

After his heroics in the 2006 Stanley Cup Playoffs, Ward became the Hurricanes starting goaltender for the 2006–07 season. He recorded season stats of 30–21–6 and 37–25–5 in the 2006–07 and 2007–08 campaigns, respectively. The Hurricanes would miss the playoffs both years. The Hurricanes, however, would reach the Eastern Conference Finals in the 2008–09 season before bowing out to the eventual Stanley Cup champion Pittsburgh Penguins. Ward went 8–10 with a 2.67 GAA during the playoffs.

Ward and the Hurricanes struggled to begin the 2009–10 season, as Ward went 2–9–3 to start the campaign. On November 8, 2009, in a game against the Columbus Blue Jackets, Ward was injured when he was cut on the leg by the skate of opposing forward Rick Nash. As Ward was helped into the dressing room, he left a trail of blood on the ice. After returning from his injury, Ward finished the season with an 18–23–5 record, a 2.69 GAA and .916 save percentage as the Hurricanes failed to qualify for the post-season.

Ward was selected to participate in the 2011 NHL All-Star Game, along with teammates Eric Staal, Jamie McBain, and Jeff Skinner. Ward was the first overall pick in the 2011 NHL All-Star Game Fantasy Draft, selected by All-Star Game captain, Eric Staal.

Ward was credited with an empty-net goal against the New Jersey Devils on December 26, 2011, when a misplaced pass from Ilya Kovalchuk found its way into the empty goal after a rebound from Ward. He is the tenth goalie in NHL history to do this.

Ward recorded his 500th game with the Carolina Hurricanes on February 27, 2015.

During the offseason, Ward re-signed with the Hurricanes to a two-year, $6.6 million contract on June 16, 2016.

On March 22, 2018, during a game against the Arizona Coyotes, the puck got stuck in his skate without his knowledge. His skates crossed the goal line when he went back into the net, ultimately resulting in an own goal. Despite this, the Hurricanes ended up winning that game 6–5.

Chicago Blackhawks
On July 1, 2018, Ward signed a one-year, $3 million contract with the Chicago Blackhawks. He went 16–12–4 sporting a career worst 3.67 GAA, 897SV% in 33 appearances in the 2018–19 season.

Retirement
On August 28, 2019, Ward signed a one-day contract with the Hurricanes and subsequently retired from professional hockey. He retired as the Hurricanes' franchise leaders in wins (318) and shutouts (27).

International play

Ward's performance in his NHL rookie season earned him consideration on a list of 81 candidates to play for Team Canada in the 2006 Winter Olympics. He was one of nine goalies selected; he was not, however, named to the Canadian squad. Additionally, Ward was named a part of the summer camp roster for Team Canada in preparation for the 2010 Winter Olympics, but did not make the final roster cut.

Ward was a member of the Canadian team that won gold at the 2007 IIHF World Championship in a 4–2 win against Finland in Moscow, as well as a member of the team that won silver at the 2008 IIHF World Championship in a 5–4 loss to Russia.

Personal life
Born in St. Paul's Hospital in Saskatoon, Ward is the second child of Ken and Laurel Ward. He grew up in the Lakeridge neighbourhood of Saskatoon and the Edmonton suburb of Sherwood Park, Alberta, spending his adolescent years in the latter.

Ward is a fan of his native province's team the Saskatchewan Roughriders of the Canadian Football League (CFL).
On March 25, 2007, Ward shaved his head for the St. Baldrick's Foundation.

Ward and his wife Cody have a son and a daughter.

Career statistics

Regular season and playoffs

International

Awards and achievements
 Bill Ranford Trophy – 2000–01 Red Deer Rebels Rookie of the Year
 CHL Second Team All-Star – 2001–02 Del Wilson Trophy, WHL East First All-Star Team
 WHL East Second All-Star Team – 2002–03
 CHL First Team All-Star – 2003–04 Del Wilson Trophy, Four Broncos Memorial Trophy, WHL East First All-Star Team
 AHL All-Rookie Team – 2004–05
 Stanley Cup champion – 2006
 Conn Smythe Trophy – 2006
 IIHF World championship gold medal – 2007
 NHL All-Star Game – 2011
 Carolina Hurricanes Hall of Fame – February 16, 2023

See also
 List of goaltenders who have scored a goal in an NHL game
 List of NHL goaltenders with 300 wins

References

External links

 
 Cam Ward biography at The Goaltender Home Page - advanced statistics and game logs

1984 births
Living people
Canadian evangelicals
Canadian ice hockey goaltenders
Carolina Hurricanes draft picks
Carolina Hurricanes players
Charlotte Checkers (2010–) players
Chicago Blackhawks players
Conn Smythe Trophy winners
Ice hockey people from Alberta
Ice hockey people from Saskatchewan
Lowell Lock Monsters players
Members of the Christian and Missionary Alliance
National Hockey League All-Stars
National Hockey League first-round draft picks
National Hockey League goaltenders who have scored in a game
Red Deer Rebels players
Sportspeople from Saskatoon
Sportspeople from Sherwood Park
Stanley Cup champions